The Upper Colorado water resource region is one of 21 major geographic areas, or regions, in the first level of classification used by the United States Geological Survey to divide and sub-divide the United States into successively smaller hydrologic units. These geographic areas contain either the drainage area of a major river, or the combined drainage areas of a series of rivers.

This region includes the drainage of: (a) the Colorado River Basin above the Lee Ferry compact point which is one mile below the mouth of the Paria River; and (b) the Great Divide closed basin. Includes parts of Arizona, Colorado, New Mexico, Utah, and Wyoming.

List of water resource subregions

See also
 List of rivers in the United States

References

Lists of drainage basins
Drainage basins
Watersheds of the United States
Regions of the United States
 Resource
Water resource regions